This list shows places located wholly or partly within the London Borough of Bromley in southeast London, United Kingdom. Places in italics are partly outside the borough. Places in bold have their own articles with that title; places not in bold are either redirects to other place articles that encompass them, or have no article at all.

The chart shows the electoral wards, the United Kingdom constituencies, post towns, postcodes and the national dialing code that cover the listed places. When these are in bold it means they cover a large part of the place, where as not in bold means they only cover a small part. If they are in italics it means they cover some of the place, but only outside the London Borough of Bromley. The chart also contains Coordinates and an image for each place.

The borough is mostly in the BR postcode area, but a substantial part is covered by the SE postcode area, a small part within the TN postcode area, a tiny part in the CR postcode area and very tiny part under the DA postcode area. The borough is covered by national dialing codes 020, 01689 and 01959.

The postcode areas BR2, BR4, BR5, and SE20 are located entirely within the London Borough of Bromley, while postcode areas, BR1, BR3, BR6, BR7, BR8, SE9, SE12, SE19, SE26, TN14, TN16, CR6, and DA14 are located partly within the borough and partly in other boroughs.

Four constituencies cover the borough, Bromley and Chislehurst, Orpington, and Beckenham, which are wholly in the borough, and also Lewisham West and Penge, which is partly in the London Borough of Bromley, and partly in the London Borough of Lewisham.

 
Lists of places in London